Enniskillen may refer to:

The town of Enniskillen in Northern Ireland
Enniskillen (Northern Ireland Parliament constituency)
Enniskillen (UK Parliament constituency)
Enniskillen, County Tyrone, a downland in County Tyrone, Northern Ireland
Wirral-Enniskillen - Local Service District in New Brunswick Canada
Enniskillen, Ontario, a township in Ontario, Canada
Rural Municipality of Enniskillen No. 3, Saskatchewan, Canada
Enniskillen Castle